Belleau Creek is a stream in St. Charles County in the U.S. state of Missouri.

Belleau Creek derives its name from John Batiste Belland, an early settler.

See also
List of rivers of Missouri

References

Rivers of St. Charles County, Missouri
Rivers of Missouri